Pedro Dias (born 7 May 1982) is a Portuguese judoka.

Achievements

External links
 
 

1982 births
Living people
Portuguese male judoka
Judoka at the 2008 Summer Olympics
Olympic judoka of Portugal
20th-century Portuguese people
21st-century Portuguese people